The 42nd Annual Japan Record Awards took place on December 31, 2000, starting at 6:30PM JST. The primary ceremonies were televised in Japan on TBS.

Award winners 
Japan Record Award:
Keisuke Kuwata (Songwriter, Composer and producer) & Southern All Stars for "Tsunami"
Best Vocalist:
Kaori Kozai
Best New Artist:
Kiyoshi Hikawa
Best Album:
Ayumi Hamasaki for "Duty"
Special Award:
Namie Amuro
Morning Musume

See also 
51st NHK Kōhaku Uta Gassen

External links
Official Website

Japan Record Awards
Japan Record Awards
Japan Record Awards
Japan Record Awards
2000